The 2011 FIBA Africa Basketball Club Championship (26th edition), was a basketball tournament  held in Morocco from December 12 to 21, 2011. The tournament, organized by FIBA Africa and hosted by AS Salé, took place at the Salle El Bouâzzaoui, in the city of Salé.

Tunisian side Étoile Sportive du Sahel won the tournament.

Draw

Squads

Preliminary round
Times given below are in UTC.

Group A

Group B

Knockout round

9-12 place classification

Quarterfinals

11th place game

9th place game

5-8 place classification

Semifinals

7th place game

5th place game

Bronze medal game

Gold medal game

Final standings

Étoile du Sahel rosterAtef Maoua, Ben Romdhane, Brahim Naddari, Ersid Ljuca, Hamdi Braa, Maher El Bekri, Moez Mestiri, Omar Mouhli, Radhouane Slimane, Willie Kemp, Zied Toumi Coach: Dragan Petričević

All Tournament Team

See also
 2011 FIBA Africa Championship

References

External links
Official website

2011 FIBA Africa Basketball Club Championship
2011 FIBA Africa Basketball Club Championship
2011 FIBA Africa Basketball Club Championship
FIBA Africa Clubs Champions Cup